Saxton is a suburb of Nelson, New Zealand, south of Stoke and northwest of Richmond.

Saxton covers a land area of 3.86 km². Its principal feature is the Saxton Field sports complex, which includes Saxton Oval – the main cricket ground of Nelson.

The area had a relatively small population at the start of the 21st century, with only 10 residents in 1996 and 20 residents in 2001. The estimated population reached 54 in 2006, 60 in 2013, and 57 in 2018.

Demography

Saxton had a population of 57 at the 2018 New Zealand census, a decrease of 3 people (-5.0%) since the 2013 census, and an increase of 3 people (5.6%) since the 2006 census. There were 27 households. There were 33 males and 24 females, giving a sex ratio of 1.38 males per female. The median age was 37.1 years (compared with 37.4 years nationally), with 6 people (10.5%) aged under 15 years, 12 (21.1%) aged 15 to 29, 36 (63.2%) aged 30 to 64, and 3 (5.3%) aged 65 or older.

Ethnicities were 78.9% European/Pākehā, 15.8% Māori, 15.8% Pacific peoples, and 5.3% other ethnicities (totals add to more than 100% since people could identify with multiple ethnicities).

The proportion of people born overseas was 15.8%, compared with 27.1% nationally.

Although some people objected to giving their religion, 57.9% had no religion, 31.6% were Christian, 5.3% were Buddhist and 5.3% had other religions.

Of those at least 15 years old, 3 (5.9%) people had a bachelor or higher degree, and 9 (17.6%) people had no formal qualifications. The median income was $31,900, compared with $31,800 nationally. The employment status of those at least 15 was that 30 (58.8%) people were employed full-time, 12 (23.5%) were part-time, and 0 (0.0%) were unemployed.

Economy

In 2018, 7.1% worked in manufacturing, 7.1% worked in transport, 7.1% worked in education, and 7.1% worked in healthcare.

Transport

As of 2018, among those who commuted to work, 57.1% drove a car, 7.1% rode in a car, 14.3% use a bike, and 14.3% walk or run.

No one used public transport.

Education

Garin College, a state-integrated Catholic secondary school for Year 9 to 13 students, is located in Saxton.

References

Suburbs of Nelson, New Zealand
Populated places in the Nelson Region